Johan J. Johansson (May 12, 1870 – December 4, 1948) was an ordinary seaman serving in the United States Navy during the Spanish–American War who received the Medal of Honor for bravery.

Biography
Johansson was born May 12, 1870, in Sweden and after entering the United States Navy was sent to fight in the Spanish–American War aboard the gunboat U.S.S. Nashville as an ordinary seaman.

On May 11, 1898, the Nashville was given the task of cutting the cable leading from Cienfuegos, Cuba. During the operation and facing heavy enemy fire, he continued to perform his duties throughout this action.

He died December 4, 1948, and was buried at Arlington National Cemetery.

Medal of Honor citation
Rank and organization: Ordinary Seaman, U.S. Navy. Born: 12 May 1870, Sweden. Accredited to: New York. G.O. No.: 521, 7 July 1899.

Citation:

On board the U.S.S. Nashville during the operation of cutting the cable leading from Cienfuegos, Cuba, 11 May 1898. Facing the heavy fire of the enemy, Johansson set an example of extraordinary bravery and coolness throughout this action.

See also

 List of Medal of Honor recipients for the Spanish–American War

References

External links
 
 

1870 births
1948 deaths
United States Navy Medal of Honor recipients
United States Navy sailors
American military personnel of the Spanish–American War
American military personnel of World War I
Swedish emigrants to the United States
Foreign-born Medal of Honor recipients
Burials at Arlington National Cemetery
Spanish–American War recipients of the Medal of Honor